Clairette is an unincorporated community located in Erath County in Central Texas. Clairette is situated in the southern part of the county along Texas State Highway 6 and the Bosque River 5 miles northwest of Hico, and 16 miles to the east of Dublin. Clairette was founded during the 1880s when the Texas Central line part of the historic Katy Railroad was constructed through the townsite on its way from the Waco area to Stamford with a branch to Cross Plains from the line at De Leon. The Katy abandoned the line through Clairette in the late 1960s. Clairette was named after a now defunct brand of soap that was popular at the time. At its peak, Clairette had a population of around 300 however, from the 1970s through the 2000s Clairette's population remained at a steady 60. Clairette declined due to the removal of the railroad but also the construction of nearby US Highway 281 and the improvement of Texas State Highway 6 which allowed for easier commuting to larger nearby areas.

References 

 Texas Escapes Online entry for Clairette
 Katy Railroad Historical Society website
 Handbook of Texas Online entry for Clairette, Texas

Unincorporated communities in Texas
Unincorporated communities in Erath County, Texas
Ghost towns in North Texas